Georgia Glastris (born August 1, 1992, in Chicago, Illinois, United States) is an American-born figure skater who competes for Greece. As of July 2014, she has won the Greek national championship three times, placed second three times, and competed in the 2010, 2011, and 2012 World Figure Skating Championships, and the 2011 and 2012 European Figure Skating Championships.

References 

1992 births
Living people
Greek female single skaters
Figure skaters from Chicago
American female single skaters
21st-century American women
Sportspeople from Chicago